The Miller School of Albemarle is a co-educational private preparatory school located in Albemarle County, Virginia.  The school was founded in 1878 with a bequest from Samuel Miller, who provided for the majority of his estate to be used for the establishment of a boarding school for girls and boys to be located on 1,600 acres near his birthplace in Albemarle County.  The main building was designed by architect Albert Lybrock.

History
Miller School was founded in 1878 with a bequest of $1.1 million from Samuel Miller, who grew up near the grounds where the school is now situated.  His will provided for the majority of his estate to be used for the establishment of a boarding school for orphaned children, a school to be located near his birthplace in Albemarle County.  By 1874, following Mr. Miller's 1869 death and the resolution of several legal disputes, architects and builders began designing and constructing The Miller Manual Labor School.  This work culminated in August, 1878, with a grand opening and dedication of the central portion of "Old Main", an impressive structure of Victorian architecture, around which much of Miller School life still revolves. "Old Main" is now on the Virginia Historic Landmarks Registry

Timeline
 1878:  The first curriculum was designed;  students received instruction in the classics as well agriculture and such trades as carpentry and metal work.
 1882:  The first baseball team won its initial game, a 55-0 victory over Fishburne Military School.
 1883:  Thomas Edison's company designed and supervised the installation of Miller School's first electric power plant, two Edison Style "K" dynamos and 250 incandescent light bulbs.
 1884:  Girls board at the school.

 1927:  With mounting operational expenses and little fund-raising, Miller School began to cut its programs;  the girls program was the first to go, not returning until the early 1990s.
 1939:   Began to phase out its farming operations and, instead, leased the land to generate income.
 1948:   Won the annual interschool boxing championship.
 1950:   Began to charge tuition to supplement its trust funds, which no longer generate sufficient yearly revenues to support the school.
 1951:   As military schools reach new heights of popularity in post-World War II America, Miller School added military programs
 1964:   224 boarding boys were enrolled at Miller School, many of them 5th and 6th graders 
 1967:   School was racially integrated.
 1984:   Miller became a founding member of the Virginia Association of Independent Schools and charted a course toward a college preparatory curriculum.
 1992:   The school accepted boy and girl day students.
 1994:   A girls boarding program began;  the military program was de-emphasized (and eventually eliminated).
 1999:   New state legislation was passed to give Miller School more flexibility and authority in the appointment of members of its own board of trustees.
 2001:  A student was awarded the first-ever Emily Couric Award for Leadership, given annually to a young woman in central Virginia who demonstrated by her good deeds the high ideals, work ethic, and leadership qualities of the late State Sen. Emily Couric
 2003: A Point Guard was named VIS Division II Player of the Year.
 2004:  The school adopted a Strategic Plan, expanded its Board of Trustees, and recommitted to a college preparatory curriculum, and set up a Development Office.

2006: A Point Guard was named VIS Division II Player of the Year.  The boys varsity baseball team won its first state championship title.
2007: The largest senior class in Miller School's history was established with 42 students. The school's historian, Peggy Flannagan, died at 101 years old. A Power Forward was named VIS Division II Player of the Year.
2008: School changed its colors from maroon and gray to teal and green. The mascot was no longer the Red Devil; Miller School's athletic teams compete as the Mavericks. A Power Forward was named VIS Division II Player of the Year.
2009: The boys varsity basketball team won its first state championship title.
2010: The girls varsity basketball team won its first state championship title.
2011: The girls basketball team wins back to back state championships.
2014: The girls varsity basketball team again wins state championship title.
2015: The girls basketball team again wins back to back state championships.
2016: The girls basketball team wins the state championships.
2017: The girls basketball team wins the state championships, four in a row!
2017: J. Michael Drude takes over as Head of School. 
2017: The boys baseball team wins the VIC championship.
2018: The boys basketball team wins the VIC Championship and the VISAA Division II State Championship. The girls basketball team wins the BRC State Championship. 5th title in a row. Boys basketball forward wins VISAA All State Player of the Year. Girls basketball guard wins VISAA All State Player of the Year.

Historic buildings

The school includes architecture designed by D. Wiley Anderson. It was listed on the National Register of Historic Places in 1974.

Honor Code
The Honor Code at Miller School is "I will not lie, steal, or cheat, nor will I tolerate any violation of the honor code by any other student."

The Honor Code is administered in large part by an Honor Committee of student and faculty members. The Honor Committee which conducts hearings with respect to allegations of Honor Code violations. These hearings are conducted in private.

AP courses
English Literature, English Language, U.S. History, Environmental Science, United States Government, Calculus AB, Calculus BC, French Literature, Economics, European History, Chemistry, Biology, Physics I, Physics II

Elective offerings
Visual Arts, Photography, Engineering, Land Management, Computer Programming,  Performance Arts, Woodworking, Music, and Drama

Community outreach
Students do a service project from 13:00 to 15:00 (EDT/EST) every other Wednesday. Students work with organizations such as Habitat for Humanity or the local hospitals and other need-based organizations. Miller School awards 35% of the student body with need based financial aid.

Extracurricular programs
The school has a National Honor Society Chapter. Membership in the National Honor Society is based on a combination of factors, including overall GPA, leadership within the school community and service to the wider community. Students who are inducted into the NHS serve as peer tutors during their time at Miller.  In addition, the Society performs some sort of community service each year, whether by volunteering with a local organization or raising money to support a local charity. In 2018, Miller School also became home to a chapter of the Spanish Honor Society (Sociedad Honoraria Hispánica), sponsored by the American Association of Teachers of Spanish and Portuguese (AATSP).

Light upon the Hill, the art literary magazine showcases student prose, poetry, photography and art work. "The Hill" is the nickname that students call the campus.
"The Bell Tower" is the name of the school magazine.

Student government
Miller School has a student government which consists of a student body President, Vice President, Secretary, and Treasurer. Each student grade has two class representatives which represent their classes during student government meetings. The student government works with the school's administration to represent the views of the students in decisions made which affect the student body. The student government works with the school's administration and board of directors to raise money and orchestrate student activities such as dances and balls with other boarding and day schools, and student requested dress down days, which are days where the school's dress code does not apply.

In popular culture
Used for the exterior and interior scenes of the boarding school attended by the characters in the film Toy Soldiers
Used for the exterior and interior scenes of the boarding school attended by the characters in the film Major Payne
Used for the opening sequence of the boarding school attended by the characters in the film Morgan Stewart's Coming Home
Used for the opening credits fly-over sequence in the film Cry Wolf

References

External links

 Miller School official website
 Miller School Alumni official website
 The Association of Boarding Schools profile

School buildings on the National Register of Historic Places in Virginia
Schools in Albemarle County, Virginia
Private high schools in Virginia
National Register of Historic Places in Albemarle County, Virginia
Gothic Revival architecture in Virginia
School buildings completed in 1878
1878 establishments in Virginia